Kenneth Bailey may refer to:

Kenneth Bailey (lawyer) (1898–1972), Australian public servant
Kenneth D. Bailey (1910–1942), United States Marine Corps officer
Kenneth D. Bailey (sociologist) (born 1943), American sociologist
Kenneth E. Bailey (1930–2016), author, professor in theology and linguist